Beloye More may refer to:
Beloye More, Russian name for the White Sea, an inlet of the Barents Sea on the northwest coast of Russia
Beloye More (rural locality), a rural locality in Kandalakshsky District of Murmansk Oblast, Russia